Phlegyas abbreviatus is a species of true bug in the family Pachygronthidae. It is found in North America.

References

Lygaeoidea
Articles created by Qbugbot
Insects described in 1876